Shirley Neilsen Blum, also known as Shirley Hopps (born 14 October 1932) is an American art historian, author, gallerist, and professor emeritus at the State University of New York, Purchase (1970–1989). She specializes in Northern Renaissance art, early Netherlandish art, and modern art. In the 1950s through the 1960s, she was active in the Los Angeles gallery scene, and she co-founded and co-ran Ferus Gallery.

Biography 
Shirley Marie Neilsen was born 14 October 1932 in Petaluma, California, to parents Dana (née Keyes) and Melvin Louis Neilsen. She received a M.A. degree in 1955 from University of Chicago and a Ph.D. in 1964 from University of California, Los Angeles (UCLA). Her thesis advisor was Karl M. Birkmeyer.

She was married in 1955 to Walter Hopps of the Ferus Gallery and future curator at Pasadena Art Museum, but the marriage ended in divorce in 1966. In 1967, she married a co-worker at the Ferus Gallery and art dealer, Irving Blum, which ended in 1976. Shirley and Irving Blum had a son born in 1969, filmmaker Jason Ferus Blum.

Shirley and Walter ran Ferus gallery together for many years. Walter Hopps and Shirley bought out Andy Warhol's first exhibition at Ferus Gallery in 1962, a collection which ended up being worth $15 million dollars by 1996.

She taught art history at her alma mater University of Chicago, from 1961 until 1962. Between 1962 and 1973, Blum was an assistant professor at University of California, Riverside. From 1970 until 1989, Blum served as a professor at State University of New York at Purchase (SUNY Purchase). At SUNY Purchase, she founded the Art History Department. Neilsen was the Charles A. Dana Department Chair at Colgate University, from 1973 until 1974.

See also 

 Women in the art history field

Publications

References 

1932 births
Living people
Women art historians
People from Petaluma, California
State University of New York at Purchase faculty
University of Chicago alumni
University of California, Los Angeles alumni
American art curators
American art historians
American art dealers
Women art dealers
University of California, Riverside faculty
Historians from California
20th-century American historians
20th-century American women writers
21st-century American historians
21st-century American women writers